The Maryland Comptroller election of 2014 was held on November 4, 2014, to elect the Comptroller of Maryland. Incumbent Democratic Comptroller Peter Franchot ran for re-election to a third term in office.

Primary elections were held on June 24, 2014. Franchot was re-nominated by the Democrats and the Republicans nominated former Amtrak CFO William Henry Campbell.

Democratic primary
Shortly after being re-elected in 2010, incumbent Comptroller Peter Franchot began considering running for Governor of Maryland in 2014. Six potential candidates for the position of Comptroller emerged during this time: State House of Delegates Majority Leader Kumar P. Barve, State Delegate Jon Cardin, State Delegate Galen R. Clagett, former Montgomery County Executive Doug Duncan, State Delegate Brian Feldman and State Senator James Rosapepe, with Barve and Rosapepe saying they would definitely run if Franchot did not. In December 2012, Franchot announced that he would not be running for governor. Barve and Rosapepe subsequently ended their campaigns and Cardin, Claggett and Duncan decided to run for other offices. In September 2013, Franchot officially declared that he was running for a third term. Feldman did not rule out challenging him but ultimately declined to do so.

Candidates

Filed
 Peter Franchot, incumbent Comptroller

Withdrew
 Kumar P. Barve, Majority Leader of the Maryland House of Delegates (ran for re-election)
 James Rosapepe, state senator (ran for re-election)

Declined
 Jon Cardin, State Delegate (ran for Attorney General of Maryland)
 Galen R. Clagett, State Delegate (ran for Mayor of Frederick)
 Doug Duncan, former Montgomery County Executive and candidate for governor in 2006 (ran for Montgomery County Executive)
 Brian Feldman, state senator (ran for re-election)

Results

Republican primary

Candidates

Filed
 William Henry Campbell, former Amtrak CFO, nominee for Comptroller in 2010 and candidate for Maryland Republican Party Chairman in 2011

Results

General election

Candidates
 Peter Franchot (Democratic), incumbent Comptroller
 William Henry Campbell (Republican), former Amtrak CFO, nominee for Comptroller in 2010 and candidate for Maryland Republican Party Chairman in 2011
 Anjali Reed Phukan (Maryland's Service Party), Party Chairman and write-in candidate

Polling

Results

See also
 2014 United States elections
 2014 Maryland gubernatorial election
 2014 Maryland Attorney General election

References

Comptroller
Maryland
Maryland comptroller elections